Else Olaug Mundal (born 8 November 1944) is a Norwegian philologist.

She was born in Vanylven and graduated with the cand.philol. degree in 1971. She was appointed as a docent in Norse philology at the University of Oslo in 1977. Being promoted to professor in 1985, she was a professor at the University of Bergen from 1994. She is a fellow of the Norwegian Academy of Science and Letters.  In 2017 she was appointed a knight of the Icelandic Order of the Falcon in connection with the state visit of Iceland's president to Norway.

Bibliography (selection)
 Odd Einar Haugen, Bernt Øyvind Thorvaldsen og Jonas Wellendorf (red.): "Fjǫld veit hon frœða: Utvalde arbeid av Else Mundal", Oslo: Novus, 2012. 
 Else Mundal and Håkan Rydving (red.): Samer som «de andra», samer om "de andra". Identitet och etnicitet i nordiska kulturmöten, Umeå: Samiska studier, Umeå universitet, 2010. 
 Slavica Ranković, Leidulf Melve og Else Mundal: Along the oral-written continuum. Types of texts, relations and their implications, Turnhout: Brepols, 2010. 
 Jon Gunnar Jørgensen, Karsten Friis-Jensen og Else Mundal (red.): Saxo og Snorre, København: Museum Tusculanums Forlag, 2010. 
 Else Mundal and Jonas Wellendorf: Oral art forms and their passage into writing, København: Museum Tusculanum Press, 2008. 
 Else Mundal and Simonetta Battista (red.): Reykholt som makt- og lærdomssenter. I den islandske og nordiske kontekst, Reykholt: Snorrastofa, 2006. 
 Else Mundal and Anne Ågotnes (red.): Ting og tekst, Bergen: Bryggens museum, 2002. 
 Else Mundal and Ingvild Øye (red.): Norm og praksis i middelaldersamfunnet, Bergen: Senter for europeiske kulturstudier, 1999. 
 Ann Christensson, Else Mundal og Ingvild Øye (red.): Middelalderens symboler, Bergen: Senter for europeiske kulturstudier, 1997. 
 Else Mundal: Legender frå mellomalderen. Soger om heilage kvinner og menn, Oslo: Samlaget, 1995. 
 Else Mundal: Sagadebatt, Oslo: Universitetsforlaget, 1977. 
 Eskil Hanssen, Else Mundal og Kåre Skadberg: Norrøn grammatikk. Lydlære, formlære og syntaks i historisk, Oslo: Universitetsforlaget, 1975. 
 Else Mundal: Fylgjemotiva i norrøn litteratur, Oslo: Universitetsforlaget, 1974.

References 

1944 births
Living people
Norwegian philologists
Women philologists
Academic staff of the University of Oslo
Academic staff of the University of Bergen
Norwegian women academics
Old Norse studies scholars
Members of the Norwegian Academy of Science and Letters